Pikul is the debut EP from the Silversun Pickups, released on Dangerbird Records in 2005. The album includes 16 untitled tracks after "...All the Go Inbetweens", all of which are about 44 seconds long each, concealing a hidden track at the end ("Sci-Fi Lullaby").  The album name comes from the nickname of a friend of the band who died, and to whom the album is dedicated. The name is commonly pronounced "Pickle", but the correct pronunciation is "pie-kull". 

The EP has one music video: "Kissing Families". 

In 2009 it was released on vinyl. 

"All The Go In Betweens" was recorded at "The Ship" in 2002. "The Fuzz" was recorded at "The Ship" in 2003. "Kissing Families" and "Booksmart Devil" were produced at Clearlake Studio in 2004. "Comeback Kid" and "Creation Lake" were produced at Sunset Sound in 2005. Album was mastered at Capitol Mastering.

"The Fuzz" and "Sci-Fi Lullaby" have only been played live once, "The Fuzz" in 2005 and "Sci-Fi Lullaby" in 2011. "...All the Go Inbetweens" was last played in 2007. "Comeback Kid" was last played in 2008. "Booksmart Devil" was last played in 2009.

"Kissing Families", "Creation Lake" and "Sci-Fi Lullaby" are the only songs from this EP that were played after 2010, with "Kissing Families" being the only one of the three to be played recently, being the 8th most played song and being played as recent as 28 September 2022 while "Creation Lake" was last played in 2013 and is the 36th most played song.

Track listing 

 Tracks 7-22 are silence of 45 seconds each.

Personnel

 Brian Aubert – Guitar, Vocals
 Nikki Monninger – Bass Guitar / Backing Vocals
 Joe Lester – Keyboards / Noises [Sounds]
 Christopher Guanlao – Drums
 Mark Chalecki – Mastered By
 Rod Cervera – Producer / Mixer (tracks 1, 2, 3, 5)
 Aaron Espinoza – Recorded By (track 6)
 Brian Thornell – Recorded By (track 4)
 Mel Kadel – Artwork
 Sara Cummings – Artwork [Layout]
 Matt Solodky – Marketing 
 Jeff Castelaz – A & R
 Peter Walker – A & R
 Smog Design, Inc. – Layouts

References

2005 debut EPs
Silversun Pickups albums